Team One, an advertising agency based in Los Angeles, California, is a division of Saatchi & Saatchi. It was founded in 1987 and focuses on luxury products and services.

History
Team One has a staff of more than 400, including offices in Chicago, New York, Atlanta, and Washington, D.C. Originally based in El Segundo, it moved to Jefferson Boulevard in the Silicon Beach technology, entertainment, and media hub of Los Angeles, in 2014. The relocation of its main offices was described in a Los Angeles Business Journal article as part of the establishment of that street as a west coast analogue of Madison Avenue—home to many of the region's top advertising agencies.

The company's clients include Lexus, HSBC Premier, Häagen Dazs, Indian Motocycle Manufacturing Company, and The Ritz Carlton.

As of June 2015, Julie Michael is president of Team One; she has been with the company since 1998.

Notable campaigns 
Noteworthy Team One advertising campaigns include:
"December to Remember" ads for Lexus, 2014
 ”Six-word wows" for The Ritz-Carlton, 2014
 "Tori 500" campaign for Lexus, 2014
 Lexus RC F ad, 2015
 1000 video ads for Facebook campaign, 2015
 Trailer for 2K Games' Evolve, 2015
 Lexus Lane Valet April Fools' Day Promotion, 2016

Virtual Reality Lab 
Team One executives launched an in-house VR Lab in April 2016 focusing on experimentation and exploring the best way to tell brand stories through VR. The agency also assembled an in-house team of six to focus on AI.

The Legacy Lab 
Legacy Lab is a consulting practice launched by Team One in 2012. The Lab has researched brands including The Bluebird Cafe, It Gets Better Project, Girls Who Code, The Ritz-Carlton, The Championships, Wimbledon and Taylor Guitars and publishes many of its findings online.

In 2016, The Legacy Lab received a Jay Chiat Award from the American Association of Advertising Agencies for its redesign work for Me & the Bees.

References

External links 
 Official web site

Advertising agencies of the United States
Companies based in Los Angeles
1987 establishments in California